A Weigh house, (waag in the Netherlands) is a public building where goods are weighed.

Waag may also refer to:

 Waag (Amsterdam), a 15th-century building on Nieuwmarkt square in Amsterdam
 Waag, Haarlem, Netherlands, a former weigh house in Haarlem that today serves as a café catering to tourists
 Waag (Paramaribo), a former weigh house in Paramaribo, Suriname
 Waag, Schwyz, a village in the municipality of Unteriberg, Schwyz, Switzerland
 Váh (German: Waag), a river in Slovakia
 Waag (Minster), a river in  Switzerland
 WAAG, a radio station licensed to Galesburg, Illinois, United States